Rab geranylgeranyltransferase also known as (protein) geranylgeranyltransferase II is one of the three prenyltransferases. It transfers (usually) two geranylgeranyl groups to the cystein(s) at the C-terminus of Rab proteins.

geranylgeranyl diphosphate + protein-cysteine  S-geranylgeranyl-Cys-protein + diphosphate

The C-terminus of Rab proteins varies in length and sequence and is referred to as hypervariable. Thus Rab proteins do not have a consensus sequence, such as the CAAX box, which the Rab geranylgeranyltransferase can recognise. Instead Rab proteins are bound by the Rab escort protein (REP) over a more conserved region of the Rab protein and then presented to the Rab geranylgeranyltransferase.

Once Rab proteins are prenylated, the lipid anchor(s) ensure that Rabs are no longer soluble. REP therefore plays an important role in binding and solubilising the geranylgeranyl groups and delivers the Rab protein to the relevant cell membrane.

Reaction 
Rab geranylgeranyltransferase (RabGGTase; enzyme commission code EC 2.5.1.60) is classified as a transferase enzyme; specifically, it is in the protein prenyltransferase family along with two other enzymes (protein farnesyltransferase and protein geranylgeranyltransferase type-I). The reaction catalyzed by RabGGTase is summarized as follows:

 geranylgeranyl diphosphate + protein-cysteine = S-geranylgeranyl-protein + diphosphate
 
This reaction is essential in the control of membrane docking and fusion. Studies of mice have shown that Rab GGTase genes are expressed in all major adult organs, as well as in some embryonic units, including the spinal cord and liver (Chinpaisal).

Rab geranylgeranyltransferase’s “outsourcing” of specificity (using REP to interact with the Rab proteins it prenylates, as mentioned above) is unique among prenyltransferases. Rab GGTase is “responsible for the largest number of individual protein prenylation events in the cell,” probably due to this ability to interact with many different Rab proteins (it can prenylate any sequence containing a cysteine residue).

In vitro studies have shown that Rab GGTase can be inhibited by nitrogen-containing bisphosphonate drugs such as risedronate; however, the effects of such drugs seem to be much more limited in vivo (Coxon).

Structure 

RabGGTase is a heterodimer composed of alpha and beta subunits that are encoded by the RABGGTA and RABGGTB genes, respectively. The structure of rat RabGGTase has been determined by X-ray diffraction (see image to the left) to a resolution of 1.80 Å. RabGGTase’s secondary structure is largely composed of alpha helices; the alpha subunit is 74% helical with no beta sheets, while the beta subunit is 51% helical and 5% beta sheet. There are 28 alpha helices total (15 in the alpha subunit and 13 in the beta subunit) and 15 very short (no more than 4 residues) beta sheets. Functional RabGGTase binds three metal ions as ligands: two calcium ions (Ca2+) and a zinc ion (Zn2+), all of which interact with the beta subunit.

See also
 Farnesyltransferase
 Geranylgeranyltransferase type 1 – also referred to as Geranylgeranyltranferase 1 or just Geranylgeranyltranferase
 Prenylation

References

 Coxon, Fraser P., Frank H. Ebetino, Emilie H. Mules, Miguel C. Seabra, Charles E. McKenna and Michael J. Rogers. Phosphonocarboxylate inhibitors of Rabnext term geranylgeranyl transferase disrupt the prenylation and membrane localization of previous termRabnext term proteins in osteoclasts in vitro and in vivo. Bone Vol. 37, Iss. 3. Sept. 2005, p. 349-358.
 Chinpaisal, Chatchai, Chih-Hao Lee and Li-Na Wei. Studies of the mouse Rabnext term geranylgeranyl transferase β subunit: gene structure, expression and regulation . Gene Vol. 184, Iss. 2 Jan. 1997, p. 237-43.
 
 
 
 
  
 Sinnott, M. (Ed.), Comprehensive Biological Catalysis. A Mechanistic Reference, vol. 1, Academic Press, San Diego, CA, 1998, p. 31-118.

External links
 

EC 2.5.1